Krasimir Krastev (born 26 August 1984) is a left midfielder association football player from Bulgaria who is currently playing for Botev Plovdiv.

Career
In 2003 the youth academy midfielder Krasimir Krastev agreed to the conditions of his first professional contract with the club, which would be effective for five years.

References

External links
 footmercato profile

Bulgarian footballers
1984 births
Living people
Footballers from Plovdiv
Association football midfielders
Botev Plovdiv players
FC Lyubimets players
First Professional Football League (Bulgaria) players